The Congress of Zacatecas is the legislature of Zacatecas, a state of Mexico. The Congress is unicameral.

See also
List of Mexican state congresses

External links
Official website

Government of Zacatecas
Zacatecas
Zacatecas